Tsubaki (つばき or ツバキ) may refer to:

People
 , Japanese snowboarder 
 , the pen name used by a member of the all-female manga-creating team Clamp
Andrew T. Tsubaki (1931-2009), Japanese theatre scholar
, Japanese speed skater
 , a Japanese transgender TV personality
 , Japanese painter  
 Hiroshi Tsubaki (born 1991), Japanese former professional cyclist 
 , a Japanese manga artist
 , Japanese footballer 
 , Japanese voice actress
 , a Japanese actor known for playing Kazuma Kenzaki in the Japanese tokusatsu television series Kamen Rider Blade

Fictional characters

Given name
Tsubaki Domyoji, from Boys Over Flowers
Tsubaki Kakyouin or "Tsubaki-hime", a character from Descendants of Darkness
Tsubaki Nakatsukasa, from Soul Eater (manga)
Tsubaki Kurogane, from ‘’Boruto: Naruto Next Generations’’
Tsubaki Oribe, from Please Twins!
Tsubaki Sanjūrō, a character from the film Sanjuro
Tsubaki Yayoi, from BlazBlue
Tsubaki Tokisaka, minor character of The SoulTaker miniseries
Tsubaki Sawabe, a main character in Your Lie in April
Tsubaki, a supporting character from Inuyasha who appeared in only four episodes in season 3
Tsubaki, an antagonist character of the 2011 manga and 2016 anime Servamp
Tsubaki (of the Kamisato Clan), minor character of Genshin Impact

Surname
Akira Tsubaki, a character from Mysterious Girlfriend X
Issei Tsubaki, a character from Full Metal Panic!
Sadamitsu Tsubaki, the main character of Sadamitsu the Destroyer
Sasuke Tsubaki, a character from Sket Dance
Tsubaki, a character from the hentai anime MeiKing (part of the Vanilla Series)

Other uses
 Tsubaki (band) (2000-), a Japanese rock (J-rock) trio
 Tsubaki Grand Shrine, a Shinto shrine in Suzuka, Japan, which is the principal shrine of the deity Sarutahiko-no-Ōkami
 Tsubaki Grand Shrine of America, the first Shinto shrine built in the mainland United States
 Camellia japonica or tsubaki, a species of flowering plants
 Japanese destroyer Tsubaki
 Tsubakimoto Chain, brand name "Tsubaki", a manufacturer of industrial drive chains, and other power transmission products
 Goto Tsubaki Airport, the airport of Fukue in the Goto Islands of far western Japan

See also
 

Japanese-language surnames
Japanese feminine given names